Zoological Science is a peer-reviewed scientific journal published by the Zoological Society of Japan covering the broad field of zoology. The journal was established in 1984 as a result of the merger of the Zoological Magazine (1888-1983) and Annotationes Zoologicae Japonenses (1897-1983), the former official journals of the Zoological Society of Japan. Zoological Science has been a BioOne member since 2007.

See also
 List of zoology journals

External links

The Zoological Society of Japan

Zoology journals
Monthly journals
Publications established in 1984
English-language journals